The Parable of the Unjust Steward or Parable of the Penitent Steward is a parable of Jesus which appears in . In it, a steward who is about to be fired tries to "curry favor" with his master's debtors by remitting some of their debts. The term "steward" is common in many English translations of the New Testament; some versions refer to a "manager", or an "accountant". This parable does not appear in the other gospels.

Text

Interpretation
No parable in the gospels has been the subject of so much controversy as this. The parable, on the face of it, appears to be commending dishonest behaviour. Most explain that the manager is forgoing a commission due to him personally, but some scholars disagree with this interpretation. However, although the master has "a certain grudging admiration" for the manager's "shrewdness", Jesus labels the manager "dishonest". To add to the interpretations, several different sayings about money were attached to the parable here. It is a matter of debate whether sayings about trust or serving two masters apply to this parable.

The manager in the parable was probably a slave or freedman acting as his master's agent in business affairs. As his master's representative, the agreements he signs with the debtors were therefore binding.

The parable shares the theme of other passages where "Jesus counsels the disposition of possessions (and hospitality) on behalf of the poor with the understanding that, while mammon will vanish, eternal treasure will have thus been secured." When death comes, "the power we have to do good with our money ceases, so we should do good with it now" so that the friends we have made on earth will be waiting for us in heaven. This interpretation was also espoused by early church writers, such as Asterius of Amasia:

English Reformer William Tyndale emphasises the consistency of this parable with the doctrine of justification by faith, writing a booklet on the parable called The Parable of the Wicked Mammon (1528), based on an exposition by Martin Luther. Tyndale saw "good works" as the result of faith. Tyndale also pointed out that the steward was not praised by Jesus for his conduct, but merely provided as an example of wisdom and diligence, so that "we with righteousness should be as diligent to provide for our souls, as he with unrighteousness provided for his body."
Anglican Charles Daubuz (1720) was among those who saw in the "eternal habitations" promised to the unjust steward a negative prediction of the grave, not a promise of heaven.

The Anglican theologian J. C. Ryle, writing in 1859, rejected a number of allegorical interpretations of the parable, and gave an interpretation similar to that of Tyndale:

David Flusser, in a book titled Jesus and the Dead Sea Scrolls, has taken the phrase "sons of light" to mean the Essenes; their closed economic system is contrasted with that of other people who were less strict.

A Confessional Lutheran apologist commented:
Jesus' parable of the unjust manager is one of the most striking in all the Gospels.  Obviously, it would be pressing the parable beyond the point of comparison to interpret it as an endorsement of dishonest business practices. Jesus' point is simply to show us what money is really for.  Typically we think of ourselves first when we answer that question. But Jesus invites us to realize that, first, our money isn't really ours -- we're simply managing it for its real owner, God. Second, even "filthy lucre" can be pressed into the service of God and our neighbor. When it is, the benefits will last beyond this life -- which the things we buy for ourselves won't. For example, money can be used to spread the Gospel, through which the Holy Spirit will gather believers into Christ's church.  We will enjoy blessed fellowship with these believers forever, long after the money itself is gone.

Elder James E. Talmage wrote:
It was not the steward’s dishonesty that was extolled; his prudence and foresight were commended, however; for while he misapplied his master’s substance, he gave relief to the debtors; and in so doing he did not exceed his legal powers, for he was still steward though he was morally guilty of malfeasance [wrongdoing]. The lesson may be summed up in this wise: … Be diligent; for the day in which you can use your earthly riches will soon pass. Take a lesson from even the dishonest and the evil; if they are so prudent as to provide for the only future they think of, how much more should you, who believe in an eternal future, provide therefor! If you have not learned wisdom and prudence in the use of ‘unrighteous mammon,’ how can you be trusted with the more enduring riches?

Catholic interpretation
According to the commentators of the New American Bible Revised Edition, the parable is about an agent who, knowing he is about to be fired for usury, repents of his sin, asking the debtors to only pay what they owe his master—rather than pay him as well. This is in line with what John the Baptist tells the tax collectors and soldiers about exploiting tax payers and debtors earlier in the gospel.

See also
 Life of Jesus in the New Testament
 Luke 16
 Ministry of Jesus

References

Citations

Sources

External links
Biblical Art on the WWW: The Shrewd Manager

Unjust Steward, Parable of the
Gospel of Luke